Switzerland women's national beach soccer team represents Switzerland in international women's beach soccer competitions and is controlled by the Swiss Football Association, the governing body of football in Switzerland. The team was created in 2008.

The Swiss team are currently the most active national women's side, having competed internationally every year since their first match in 2009 and having played over 20 matches during that time. Having only previously competed in friendlies and exhibition events, Switzerland Women subsequently debuted competitively in the first official women's event organised by Beach Soccer Worldwide (BSWW) in 2016, the Women's Euro Beach Soccer Cup. In both editions to date, the Swiss have finished runners-up.

The squad mostly comprises players who play in the Suzuki Swiss Beach Soccer Women-League.

Current squad
As of July 2017 (Chosen for the 2017 Euro Beach Soccer Cup)

Coach: Franziska Steinemann

Competitive record
As of March 2018

Women's Euro Beach Soccer Cup

Head-to-head records
Includes competitive and friendly matches.

See also
Switzerland men's national beach soccer team

References

External links
Switzerland Women, Beach Soccer Worldwide profile
Swiss Team Women, at Swiss Beach Soccer

European women's national beach soccer teams
Women's national sports teams of Switzerland